This work in progress is a list of all paintings by John Everett Millais.

Youthworks
Emily Millais. Ca. 1843. Oil on canvas, 59.7 x 49.5 cm. Geoffrey Richard Everett Millais Collection.
Pizarro Seizing the Inca of Peru. 1846. Oil on canvas, 128,3 x 172,1 cm. Victoria & Albert Museum, London, United Kingdom.
Self Portrait. 1847. Oil on millboard, 27,3 x 22,2 cm.
The Artist Attending the Mourning of a Young Girl. Ca. 1847. Oil on board, 18,7 x 25,7 cm.

Pre-Raphaelite Brotherhood
Isabella. 1848–49. Oil on canvas, 102,9 x 142,9 cm. Walker Art Gallery, Liverpool, United Kingdom.
The Death of Romeo and Juliet
Cymon and Iphigeneia
Ralph Thomas
William Hugh Fenn
Ferdinand Lured by Ariel
'Christ in the House of His Parents' or 'The Carpenter's Shop'
Portrait of a Gentleman and his Grandchild (James Wyatt and his Granddaughter, Mary Wyatt)
Portrait of Four Children of the Wyatt Family
The Woodman's Daughter
Mariana
The Eve of St. Agnes
Mrs James Wyatt and her Daughter Sarah
Wilkie Collins
Thomas Combe
Ophelia
A Huguenot, on St Bartholomew's Day, refusing to shield himself from danger by wearing the Roman Catholic badge
The Return of the Dove to the Ark
The Bridesmaid
Emily Patmore (of Emily Augusta Patmore)
The Order of Release, 1746
The Proscribed Royalist, 1651
John Ruskin
Waterfall at Glenfinlas
Effie Ruskin
Effie Ruskin

A.R.A.
L'Enfant du Régiment
The Blind Girl
Waiting
The Violet's Message
Annie Miller
Autumn Leaves
The Rescue
Wandering Thoughts
Spring
Peace Concluded, 1856
Only a Lock of Hair
The Escape of a Heretic, 1559
Portrait of Sophy Gray
Sir Isumbras (A Dream of the Past)
The Vale of Rest 'Where the weary find repose'The Black BrunswickerMeditationThe RansomThe Eve of St. AgnesR.A.The Flower ArrangementMy First SermonTrust MeLily NobleEstherHarold Heneage Finch-HattonLeisure HoursMy Second SermonJohn Wycliffe TaylorSleepingThe Parable of the TaresWakingHugh Cayley of WydaleThe MinuetJephthahNina LehmannSistersSouvenir of VelasquezStellaThe Gambler's WifeThe Boyhood of RaleighThe Marchioness of HuntlyChill OctoberThe Knight ErrantA SomnambulistFlowing to the RiverCharles LiddellMrs BischoffsheimOh! that a dream so sweet, so long enjoy'd, Should be so sadly, cruelly destroy'd' – Moore's 'Lalla RookhHearts are Trumps: Portraits of Elizabeth, Diana, and Mary, Daughters of Walter Armstrong, Esq.Isabella HeughEffie MillaisScotch Firs 'The Silence that is in the lonely woods.' – WordsworthWinter Fuel 'Bare ruined choirs, where once the sweet birds sang' – ShakespeareNew Laid EggClarissa BischoffsheimThe Deserted GardenThe North-West PassageThe Fringe of the MoorTwinsOver the Hills and Far AwayDead PheasantsGeorge Gray MillaisThe Sound of Many WatersLord Ronald GowerA Jersey LilyBright EyesThomas CarlyleYesPuss in BootsEffie DeansThe Right Hon. W.E. Gladstone, M.P.The tower of strength which stood Four-square to all the winds that blew.' – TennysonThe Princes in the TowerSt Martin's SummerCherry RipeLouise JoplingBeatrix CairdPortrait of the PainterKate PeruginiSophie CairdThe CaptiveBenjamin Disraeli, The Earl of Beaconsfield, K.G.Alfred TennysonCardinal John Henry NewmanSir Henry ThompsonRobert Gascoyne-Cecil, 3rd Marques of SalisburyHenry IrvingSelf PortraitWilliam Ewart GladstoneThe Ruling PassionBubblesPortiaArchibald Philip Primrose, 5th Earl of RoseberyChristmas EveThe Old GardenDew-Drenched FurzeGlen BirnamDorothy LawsonLingering Autumn 'No spring, nor summer beauty hath such grace/As I have seen in one autumnal face.' – DonneThe Little Speedwell's Darling Blue.' 'In Memorian', – TennysonMary ChamberlainBlow, Blow, Thou Winter Wind. – 'As You Like It', act.ii. sc. 7St StephenSpeak! Speak!''

References

Millais, John Everett